Jemulpo District (Jemulpo-gu) is a proposed ward of the city of Incheon, South Korea, Jemulpo-gu is located in a historic center of Incheon. Jemulpo was founded in 1883 on the opening of the Jemulpo Port and contains several historical and cultural heritage monuments, such as Dap-dong Cathedral, Hongyemun Gate, The First Anglican Church, and Jayu Park, Korea's first modern park.

History 

In modern times Jemulpo became a trading port, eventually growing to become the second-largest port in South Korea. In 1968, Incheon was divided to four districts including Dong and Jung Districts. In 1989, Yeongjong-Yongyu was transferred to Jung District. Yeongjong-Yongyu suffered rapid population growth due to the development of Incheon International Airport but old downtown area of Incheon suffered rapid population decline. Therefore many residents Yeongjong-Yongyu demanded that Yeongjong-Yongyu should be a district of Incheon and old downtown area of Jung District, Incheon should be merged with Dong District, Incheon. In 2022, Yeongjong-Yongyu's Korean national population exceeded 100 thousands and  old downtown area of Jung and Dong Districts.

On August 31, 2022. Yoo Jeong-bok who is a Mayor of Incheon officialized this proposal to a city policy. Old downtown area of Jung District and Dong District will be merged into Jemulpo District and Yeongjong-Yongyu will be an independent Yeongjong District. Two mayors of effected districts agreed this proposal.

Administrative Divisions

Former Jung District 
Sinpo-dong (divided in turn into Jungang-dong 1 to 4 Ga, Haean-dong 1 to 4 Ga, Gwandong 1 to 3 Ga, Songhak-dong 1 to 3 Ga, Sadong, Sinsaeng-dong, Dapdong, Sinpo-dong, Hangdong 1 to 6 Ga and some portion of Hangdong 7-ga)
Yeonan-dong (divided in turn into some portions of Hangdong 7-ga and Bukseong-dong 1-ga)
 Gaehang-dong
Bukseong-dong (divided in turn into Bukseong-dong 2 and 3 Ga, some portion of Bukseong-dong 1-ga and Seollin-dong)
Songwol-dong 1 to 3 Ga
Sinheung-dong (divided in turn into Sinheung-dong 1 to 3 Ga and Seonhwa-dong)
Yulmok-dong (divided in turn into Yulmok-dong and Yudong)
Dong Incheon-dong (divided in turn into Nae-dong, Gyeong-dong, Yong-dong, Inhyeon-dong, and Jeon-dong)
Dowon-dong

Former Dong District 
Manseok-dong
Hwasu 1-Hwapyeong Dong
Hwasu 2-dong
Songhyeon 1 to 3 Dong
Songnim 1 to 6 Dong
Geumchang-dong (combination of Geumgok-dong and Changyeong-dong)

Education
International schools:
 Overseas Chinese Primary and Middle/High School, Incheon (인천화교소·중산중고등학교)

University:
JEI University

Tourist attractions
Jajangmyeon Museum is a museum about Jajangmyeon noodle.

Incident

References

Proposed political divisions
Districts of Incheon